Enrique Hertzog assumed office as the 42nd president of Bolivia on 10 March 1947, and his term ended upon his resignation on 22 October 1949. A physician who served in various ministerial positions since the 1920s, Hertzog was elected as the head of the Republican Socialist Unity Party (PURS) ticket in the 1947 general elections.

Hertzog formed seven cabinets during his 31-month presidency, constituting the 114th to 120th national cabinets of Bolivia. A further two cabinets, constituting the 121st and 122nd national cabinets, were formed during his term by Vice President Mamerto Urriolagoitía who was serving as acting president at the time.

Cabinet Ministers

Composition

First cabinet 

Upon his inauguration on 10 March 1947, Hertzog appointed his first ministerial cabinet. The cabinet was a return to the more conservative elements of the country which had been sidelined during the left-wing government of Gualberto Villarroel. It predominantly consisted of members of the newly formed Republican Socialist Unity Party (PURS) created from the merger of the Genuine Republican, Socialist Republican, and United Socialist parties.

The only holdover from the previous administration was José Saavedra Suárez as Minister of Agriculture. Néstor Guillén, who had served as interim president and Minister of Defense following the death of Villarroel, returned to his defense position. Mamerto Urriolagoitía was appointed Foreign Minister in conjunction with his position as vice president.

Second cabinet 
Unlike the Republicans, the Liberal Party did not become a founding member of the PURS. Nonetheless, Hertzog attempted to form a national unity cabinet and invited the PL to join in alliance with the new government, a fact which upset PURS leadership as well as Vice President Urriolagoitía. When Hertzog formed his second cabinet on 14 May 1947, Luis Fernando Guachalla, who had been the Liberla presidential candidate in 1947 losing to Hertzog by a difference of just 443 votes, was chosen to succeed Urriolagoitía as Foreign Minister. Despite being ideologically Communist, the Revolutionary Left Party also joined the conservative coalition with two of its members, Gustavo Henrich and Alfredo Mendizábal, being appointed Ministers of Public Works and Communications and Work and Social Security respectively.

Third, fourth, fifth, and sixth cabinets 
Hertzog's third cabinet was formed on 11 September 1947. Guachalla was replaced as Foreign Minister by Tomás Manuel Elío who would serve his fifth and final nonconsecutive term. Luis Fernando's brother, Carlos Guachalla, was appointed Ministry of Finance. Hertzog's fourth cabinet, formed on 1 March 1948, saw Adolfo Costa du Rels appointed Foreign Minister. Costa du Rels had previously been the last President of the League of Nations, which by 1947 was defunct in favor of the United Nations.

Hertzog's fifth cabinet was formed on 9 August 1948. At just two days from 9 to 11 August, the term of office of Julio Céspedes Añez as Minister of Work and Social Security is the second shortest term for any Bolivian government minister after Juan José Torres who served for just one day from 5 to 6 November 1964 during the government of René Barrientos. Formed on 28 January 1949, Hertzog's sixth cabinet introduced Waldo Belmonte Pool, a previous President of the Chamber of Senators and acting president during the administration of Enrique Peñaranda, as Minister of National Defense.

Seventh cabinet and Urriolagoitía acting cabinets 
Hertzog's seventh and final cabinet was formed on 4 March 1949. This one would only last for two months. On 1 May 1949, legislative elections were held in which the left-wing parties dramatically rose in support. Following subsequent election-related violence, PURS leadership lost confidence in Hertzog and forced him to hand power under the pretence of a nonexistent illness to Vice President Mamerto Urriolagoitía on 7 May. In his capacity as acting president, Urriolagoitía formed two cabinets on 20 May and 2 August 1949. However, Hertzog would not officially resign until 22 October meaning both cabinets were formed during his term. Nevertheless, the fact that the ministers were appointed by Urriolagoitía mean that they are generally regarded as Urriolagoitía's first and second cabinets rather than Hertzog's eight and ninth.

Gallery

Notes

References

Bibliography 
 

Cabinets of Bolivia
Cabinets established in 1947
Cabinets disestablished in 1949
1947 establishments in Bolivia